Itens  is a village in Súdwest-Fryslân municipality in the province of Friesland, the Netherlands. It had a population of around 236 in January 2017.

History
The village was first mentioned in 1381 as Ytzinse, and means "settlement of the people of It(s)e (person)". Itens a terp (artificial living hill) village. Pottery has been found in the terp dating from the beginning of our era.

The Dutch Reformed church was built in 1806 and has a tower from 1842. Itens was home to 124 people in 1840.  Before 2018, the village was part of the Littenseradiel municipality and before 1984 it belonged to Hennaarderadeel municipality.

References

External links

Súdwest-Fryslân
Populated places in Friesland